The 74th annual Locarno Festival was held from 4 August to 14 August 2021 in Locarno, Switzerland. The opening film of the festival was Beckett by Ferdinando Cito Filomarino, which had its world premiere on 4 August. The 74th edition of Locarno Film Festival  hosted 14 films including 7 world premieres in Piazza Grande among which half were European productions. More than 75,000 spectators attended the festival. 50% less than the attendance rate in 2019 before the COVID-19 pandemic.

Events
Rotonda by la Mobiliare -Come together!
This event will be held from 30 July to 14 August. It is Locarno Film Festival’s communal space, which embraces existing audience and greets new people. It will have following platforms:
 Art
 Virtual Reality
 Forum
 Talks
 Music
 Food and beverage
 Kids town
 Come together

Locarno Talks la Mobiliare
During the course of the film festival, it will be a stage for exchanging and debating ideas and perspectives. It will have encounters with people from the world of art, photography, cinema  music, politics and science.

Cinema and youth

This is an initiative open to 28 final year students of high school or vocational school of Switzerland and Northern Italy, aged between 18 and 23. They will be privileged viewers as they may watch the screenings, meet directors and actors/actresses, attend specially organized introductory lectures on film language. In addition they will have access to the sidebar events.

Jury

International competition

 Eliza Hittman (Jury President), American screenwriter, film director and producer 
 Kevin Jerome Everson (American artist and filmmaker)
 Philippe Lacôte (Director from Ivory Coast)
 Leonor Silveira (Portuguese film actress)
 Isabella Ferrari (Italian actress of television, theatre and the cinema)

Filmmakers of the present competition
 Agathe Bonitzer, (French actress) 
 Mattie Do (Laotian American film director)
 Vanja Kaludjercic (Festival director)

Leopards of tomorrow
 Kamal Aljafari, (Palestinian filmmaker and artist)
 Marie-Pierre Macia, (French Producer) 
 Adina Pintilie (Romanian film director, screenwriter, visual artist and curator)

First feature
 Amjad Abu Alala (Sudanese film director, screenwriter and producer)
 Karina Ressler (Austrian editor)
 Katharina Wyss (Switzerland, filmmaker)

Sections

Pre-festival
 LYNX by Laurent Geslin
 Tomorrow My Love by Gitanjali Rao

Piazza Grande 

Closing film
Highlighted title indicates closing film.
Highlighted title indicates special award winning film.

International competition (Concorso internazionale) 
Highlighted title indicates award winner
Highlighted title indicates Golden Leopard winner

Filmmakers of the present competition (Concorso Cineasti del presente)

Leopards of tomorrow (Pardi di domani)
The section consists of three competitions: 
 International competition (Concorso internazionale): Works by emerging filmmakers from all over the world; 
 National competition (Concorso nazionale): Swiss productions; and 
 Competition of Author's Courts (Concorso Corti d’autore): short works by established directors

International competition (Concorso internazionale)

National competition (Concorso nazionale)

Competition of Author's Courts (Concorso Corti d’autore)

Out of competition (Fuori concorso)

Open doors screenings

History (s) of cinema (Histoire(s) du cinéma)

Retrospective (Retrospettiva)

Locarno Kids: screenings

Swiss panorama (Panorama Suisse)

Critics' week (Semaine de la critique)

Awards

Leopard of Honour (Pardo d’onore Manor award)
 John Landis was honored  with Leopard of Honour, the lifetime achievement award (Pardo d’onore Manor award) on August 13 at Locarno’s Piazza Grande.

Special Awards
Excellence Award Davide Campari

 Laetitia Casta received Excellence Award Davide Campari on 4 August 2021.

Locarno Film Festival Short Film Candidate for the European Film Awards
In Flow of Words
Special Lifetime achievement award: Dario Argento

Prix du public UBS Award: Hinterland by Stefan RuzowitzkyVariety Piazza Grande Award: Rose by Aurélie SaadaThe following awards were presented for films shown in competition:

International competition

 Seperti Dendam, Rindu Harus Dibayar Tuntas (Vengeance Is Mine, All Others Pay Cash) By Edwin A New Old Play (Jiao Ma Tang Hui) by Qui Jiongjiong Abel Ferrara, Zeros and Ones

 Mohamed Mellali, Valero Escolar, The Odd-Job Men, (Sis dies corrents) by Neus Ballús

 Anastasiya Krasovskaya, Gerda by Natalya Kudryashova
Special Mentions:
Soul Of A Beast by Lorenz Merz 
Espíritu sagrado (The Sacred Spirit) by Chema García Ibarra

Filmmakers of the present competition
 Golden Leopard - Filmmakers of the Present: Brotherhood by Francesco Montagner Special Jury Prize: L’Été L’éternité by Émilie Aussel Best Emerging Director: Hleb Papou, Il Legionario
 Leopard for the Best Actress: Saskia Rosendahl, No One’s With the Calves by Sabrina Sarabi
 Leopard for the Best Actor: Gia Agumava, Wet Sand, by Elene Naveriani

Leopards of Tomorrow
 Pardino d’oro SRG SSR for the Best International Short Film: Neon Phantom (Fantasma Neon) by Leonardo Martinelli Pardino d’oro Swiss Life for the Best Author Short Film: Creature (Criatura) by María Silvia Esteve Pardino d’argento SRG SSR for the International Competition: The Demons of Dorothy, (Les Démons De Dorothy by Alexis Langlois Pardi di domani Best Direction Award – BONALUMI Engineering: Eliane Esther Bots, In Flow of Words 
 Medien Patent Verwaltung AG Award: Home (Imuhira) by Myriam Uwiragiye Birara
Special Mentions
First Time (The Time For All But Sunset – Violet) by Nicolaas Schmidt

National competition

 Pardino d’oro Swiss Life for the Best Auteur Short Film: Strangers (Chute) by Nora Longatti
 Pardino d’argento Swiss Life for the National Competition: After A Room by Naomi Pacifique
 Best Swiss Newcomer Award: Flavio Luca Marano, Jumana Issa, It Must (Es Muss)

First feature
 Swatch First Feature Award: She Will by Charlotte Colbert
Special Mention
Holy Emy (Agia Emi) by Araceli Lemos

References

External links
 

Locarno
2021 festivals in Europe
2021 in Switzerland
Locarno Festival
Events postponed due to the COVID-19 pandemic
August 2021 events in Switzerland